Rogolo (Lombard: Rugul) is a comune (municipality) in the Province of Sondrio in the Italian region Lombardy, located about  northeast of Milan and about  west of Sondrio.
Rogolo borders the following municipalities: Andalo Valtellino, Cosio Valtellino, Delebio, Mantello, Pedesina, Premana, Rasura.

Demographic evolution

Administration

Photo gallery

References

External links
 Comunita Montana Valtellina di Morbegno - Comune di Rogolo

Cities and towns in Lombardy